Feleti Vakaʻuta Sevele, Lord Sevele of Vailahi (born 7 July 1944) was the Prime Minister of the Kingdom of Tonga from 30 March 2006 to 22 December 2010.

Biography

Early life
Lord Sevele was born in Ma’ufanga, Nuku’alofa.  He began his high school education at Apifo'ou College in Tonga, then went to school in Fiji at St John's College in Levuka on the island of Ovalau, and the Marist Brothers High School, Suva. He then attended St Bede's College in Christchurch, New Zealand, before going to the University of Canterbury where he graduated with a BSc degree in mathematics, and a BA, an MA and a PhD degree in economic geography titled  'Regional inequalities in socio-economic development in Tonga' . He was awarded an honorary doctorate in 2003.

Career
Upon returning to Tonga he was employed by the Tonga Commodities Board, then as chief economist for the South Pacific Commission, and as a councilor for the University of the South Pacific. He subsequently worked as Director of Catholic Education, a consultant, and businessman.

Sevele was first elected as one of nine People's Representatives to the Legislative Assembly or Fale Alea in the 1999 election and re-elected in subsequent elections.  In March 2005 he was appointed to the Cabinet as Minister for Labour, Commerce and Industries, becoming one of the first two elected representatives to be appointed to Cabinet.  As Minister he negotiated Tonga's becoming a member of the World Trade Organization in December 2005. In early 2006 he presented an Employment Relations Bill to Cabinet, based on the Fijian Bill of the same name, as a response to the public service strike of 2005.

Prime Minister

Sevele is the country's third non-noble Prime Minister after Shirley Waldemar Baker and Siosateki Tonga. He was appointed Acting Prime Minister after the sudden resignation of Ahoeitu Unuakiotonga Tukuaho (at that time commonly known as: Ulukālala Lavaka Ata) on 11 February 2006, six months after a series of pro-democracy protests that called for a lesser role in government for the royal family. Sevele's role was made permanent by King Tāufaʻāhau Tupou IV, when he appointed Dr Sevele as the Prime Minister of Tonga on 30 March 2006.

On 19 September 2007, Sevele was received by Philippine President Gloria Macapagal Arroyo in Malacañang. He attended the Asian Development Bank's "Mobilizing Aid for Trade" conference (18 to 20 September).

Following the resignation of Finance Minister Siosiua 'Utoikamanu, Sevele temporarily took over his portfolio on 26 February 2008 until 'Otenifi Afu'alo Matoto was appointed as Finance Minister on 20 March.

Sevele did not seek re-election at the 2010 elections. Following the completion of his term as Prime Minister he was created a Tongan life peer by King George Tupou V with the noble title of Lord Sevele of Vailahi.

Honours
National honours
  Order of Queen Sālote Tupou III, Knight Grand Cross with collar (31 July 2008).

References

External links

Profile at Tongan Government website
Pacific Magazine
Matangi Tonga
Photos of Prime Minister Sevele's trip to Los Angeles and Honolulu November 2007

1944 births
Foreign ministers of Tonga
People educated at Marist Brothers High School, Fiji
People educated at St Bede's College, Christchurch
Industry ministers of Tonga
Labour ministers of Tonga
Trade ministers of Tonga
Living people
Members of the Legislative Assembly of Tonga
Prime Ministers of Tonga
Tongan economists
University of Canterbury alumni
Tongan nobles
Tongan businesspeople
People from Nukuʻalofa
Knights Grand Cross of the Order of Queen Sālote Tupou III